The Billups Neon Crossing Signal was a prototypical grade crossing signal installed at a dangerous Illinois Central crossing on Mississippi Highway 7 (now Mississippi Highway 332) in Grenada, Mississippi.

It was installed in the mid-1930s by inventor Alonzo Billups over growing concern due to numerous accidents at the crossing involving trains and motor vehicles.  Like nothing before, the Billups signal was a large gantry spanning the highway and was likely the first such use of a gantry-style crossing of the type now in relatively common use.  Upon approach of a train, a giant neon sign lit up with the words "Stop-DEATH-Stop" beneath a lighted skull and crossbones.  Flashing neon arrows indicated the direction of oncoming trains and an air raid siren in lieu of bells provided aural warning. As a backup, standard railway flashers were mounted below the neon sign.  The signal was known locally as the "Skull and Crossbones."

The onset of World War II brought about a scarcity of neon which, when coupled with maintenance problems with the signal (often manifesting themselves in the siren sounding continuously until a crew arrived to stop it) meant that no further signals were produced.  The prototype was removed after less than thirty years of service, being replaced with standard railway crossing flashers and bells.

In 2022, Lionel, LLC introduced a working O scale model of the Billups crossing signal for their model train accessory lineup.

References

Kalmbach Publishing, TRAINS Magazine, May 2003, Stop-DEATH-Stop, "Railroad Reading"

External links
Photograph taken in 1940 of the crossing
Photograph taken shortly before it was dismantled
Video simulation of crossing in action

Illinois Central Railroad
Railway signaling in the United States
Level crossings
Buildings and structures in Grenada County, Mississippi
Individual signs in the United States
1930s establishments in Mississippi